Desmond Zwar, born in Beechworth, Victoria, was an author and veteran reporter from Melbourne, Australia. He studied at Scotch College, Melbourne, graduating in 1949.

He worked for the Border Mail in Albury, New South Wales, and The Herald (now the Herald Sun) in Melbourne. He was a reporter, foreign correspondent, feature writer and acting features editor of the Daily Mail in London for 11 years. Having previously lived near Cairns in Queensland, he resided in Beechworth.

Zwar was most famous for conducting an interview over several years with imprisoned Nazi leader Rudolf Hess. That gained international attention because Zwar persuaded Hess to admit that he had been part of the planning team for the invasion of the Soviet Union. The imminent invasion was what had convinced Hess to try, at the last moment, to seek an alliance with Britain against Bolshevism by flying to Scotland in 1941.

Zwar's son, Adam Zwar, is an actor in Australia.

On April 27, 2022, his son Adam announced on social media that Zwar had passed away.

Books by Desmond Zwar

 The Infamous Of Nuremberg, Written For Col.Burton C Andrus, Published In 1969 By Coward-McCann, US, Leslie Frewin, UK; And In Several European Countries.
 This Wonderful World Of Golf, With Peter Thomson, Published In 1969 By Pelham Books, UK. .
 The Loneliest Man in the World: the inside story of the 30-year imprisonment of Rudolf Hess. Written For Col. Eugene Bird. Secker & Warburg, London, 1974. Published by Viking US and in 10 Other Countries. . 
 Vet In The Clouds, With Vet Don Lavers, Published By Granada UK. 1978. .
 In Search Of Keith Murdoch, Published By Macmillan, Aust. And UK. 1980. .
 The Soul Of A School, Published By Macmillan, Aust. 1982. .
 New Frontiers Of Medical Research, Published By Stein & Day, US, And In Japan. .
 The Magic Mussel, Arthritis Another Way, Published By Ideas Unlimited, Aust., 1983. .
 The Dame: the Life and Times of Dame Jean Macnamara, Medical Pioneer, Published By Macmillan, Aust., 1984. .
 The Ma Evans Baldness Cure, Woodland Books, US, 1984.
 Golf: The Dictionary, Published By Sun Books, Aust., David & Charles, UK, Tomas Books, Germany, 1984. .
 Doctor Ahead Of His Time - The Life of Dr. Ainslie Meares, Psychiatrist, Published By Greenhouse Publications, 1985. .
 The Mad, Mad World of Unisex Golf, Published By Ideas Unlimited, Aust. 1990. .
 Disgrace! The Saga of The Downfall Of Medical Hero, Dr.William Mcbride. 
 The Queen, Rupert & Me, Sid Harta Publishing, Hartwell, Victoria, Australia, 2004/5/6. .
 Talking To Rudolf Hess, The History Press UK, 2010. .

References

External links
  Book Review of Memoirs of a Hackneyed Hack

Australian journalists
Living people
Year of birth missing (living people)